A constitutional referendum was held in France on 5 May 1946. Voters were asked whether they approved of a new draft Constitution proposed by the Constituent Assembly elected in 1945 (the "Constitutional Bill of 19 April 1946").

The draft Constitution, approved by the Constituent Assembly on 19 April 1946, was supported by the Communists and the Socialists. It concentrated power in a unicameral Assembly and abolished the Senate of France.

Moderates, Radicals, and the Popular Republican Movement (MRP) campaigned against the referendum. The "No" coalition warned the voters against the danger of a "dictatorship" of an Assembly dominated by the Marxists, which could question the existence of private property. In the "Yes" coalition, the SFIO refused the Communist proposition of a common campaign.

The draft Constitution was rejected by 52.8% of voters, with a turnout of 79.6%. It was the first referendum in France in which the proposal put to voters was rejected.

As a result of the vote, the Constituent Assembly elected in 1945 was dissolved and fresh elections for a new Constituent Assembly were held on 2 June 1946. This second Constituent Assembly adopted a different draft Constitution on 29 September 1946. This second draft was submitted to the French people in the referendum of 13 October 1946 and was approved, resulting in the enactment of the Constitution of the French Fourth Republic, signed into law by the President of the Provisional Government on 27 October 1946.

Results

See also 
 May 1946 French constitutional referendum in Algeria
 May 1946 French constitutional referendum in Cameroon
 May 1946 French constitutional referendum in Chad–Ubangi-Shari
 May 1946 French constitutional referendum in Dahomey and Togo
 May 1946 French constitutional referendum in French Somaliland
 May 1946 French constitutional referendum in French Sudan−Niger
 May 1946 French constitutional referendum in Gabon–Moyen Congo
 May 1946 French constitutional referendum in Guinea
 May 1946 French constitutional referendum in Ivory Coast
 May 1946 French constitutional referendum in Mauritania−Senegal
 May 1946 French constitutional referendum in Tunisia

References

Referendums in France
1946 in France
1946 referendums
May 1946 events in Europe
1946 elections in France
Constitutional referendums in France

pl:Referendum konstytucyjne we Francji w 1945 roku
ru:Французский конституционный референдум (1945)